Süngütepe, historically Bavuk, is a village in the Kilis District, Kilis Province, Turkey. The village is inhabited by Kurds of the Delikan tribe and had a population of 459 in 2022.

In late 19th century, the village was a settlement of 10 houses inhabited by Kurds.

References

Villages in Kilis District
Kurdish settlements in Kilis Province